Mohamed Khadem Khorasani Azghadi (7 September 1935 – 24 November 2020) was an Iranian featherweight freestyle wrestler. He won a silver medal at the 1962 World Championships and placed eighth at the 1960 Summer Olympics. His sons Amir Reza Khadem and Rasoul Khadem and ebrahim khadem were also doctor and Olympic freestyle wrestlers.

References

Sportspeople from Mashhad
Olympic wrestlers of Iran
Wrestlers at the 1960 Summer Olympics
Iranian male sport wrestlers
World Wrestling Championships medalists
1935 births
2020 deaths
20th-century Iranian people
21st-century Iranian people